is a park located in Tokorozawa, Saitama Prefecture in Japan. It contains the Tokorozawa Aviation Museum.

History
The park is built on the former site of Tokorozawa Airfield, Japan's first airfield, which was opened on April 1, 1911. Japan's first plane, the Kaishiki biplane No.1, made its first flight at Tokorozawa on October 13, 1911.

References

External links

  

Parks and gardens in Saitama Prefecture
Tokorozawa, Saitama
Parks established in 1978
1978 establishments in Japan